The fifth season of the American television sitcom The Nanny aired on CBS from October 1, 1997, to May 13, 1998. The series was created by actress Fran Drescher and her-then husband Peter Marc Jacobson, and developed by Prudence Fraser and Robert Sternin. Produced by Sternin and Fraser Ink Inc., Highschool Sweethearts  and TriStar Television, the series features Drescher, Jacobson, Fraser, Sternin, Caryn Lucas and Diane Wilk as executive producers.

Based on an idea inspired by Drescher's visit with a friend and The Sound of Music, the season revolves around Fran Fine, a Jewish woman from Flushing, Queens, New York, who is hired by a wealthy Broadway producer to be the nanny to his three children. Drescher stars as the titular character, Charles Shaughnessy as British-born producer Maxwell Sheffield, and the children – Maggie, Brighton and Grace – portrayed by Nicholle Tom, Benjamin Salisbury, and Madeline Zima. The series also features Daniel Davis as Niles, the family butler, and Lauren Lane as C.C. Babcock, Maxwell's associate in his production company who is smitten with him. Several recurring characters also played a role in the sitcoms plotlines, many of whom were related to Fran.

Lauren Lane was pregnant through half the season, which was covered up by a scripted weight gain and a character arc that allowed her to be absent for several episodes.

Cast and characters

Main
 Fran Drescher as Fran Fine
 Charles Shaughnessy as Maxwell Sheffield
 Daniel Davis as Niles
 Lauren Lane as Chastity Claire "C.C" Babcock
 Nicholle Tom as Maggie Sheffield
 Benjamin Salisbury as Brighton Sheffield
 Madeline Zima as Grace Sheffield

Recurring
 Renée Taylor as Sylvia Fine
 Rachel Chagall as Val Toriello
 Ann Morgan Guilbert as Yetta Rosenberg
 Spalding Gray as Dr. Jack Miller

Guest stars
 Joey Slotnick as Brian Levine
 Michael Ensign as Trevor
 Jennie Kwan as Mai Ling
 Allan Rich as Uncle Ray
 Fred Stoller as Fred, the pharmacist
 Ajay Mehta as Akbar
 Vasili Bogazianos as Burglar
 Chris Hogan as Dirk
 T. K. Carter as Ty
 Leila Kenzle as Naomi Demble
 Richard Fancy as Chandler Evans
 Liz Torres as Consuela
 Jessica Tuck as C.C.'s Replacement
 Kathryn Joosten as Ward Nurse
 Yvonne Sciò as Geneviève
 Sophie Ward as Jocelyn Sheffield
 Darryl Hickman as Officiating Priest
 Morty Drescher as Uncle Stanley

Special guest stars
 Roseanne Barr as Cousin Sheila
 Elton John as himself
 David Furnish as himself
 Brian Setzer as himself
 Lainie Kazan as Aunt Freida
 Joyce Brothers as Dr. Joyce Brothers
 Chevy Chase as himself
 Ray Charles as Sammy
 Bryant Gumbel as himself
 Harry Hamlin as Professor Steve
 Scott Baio as Dr. Frankie Cresitelli
 Michael Bolton as himself
 Joan Van Ark as Margo Lange
 Cindy Adams as herself
 Dick Martin as Preston Collier
 Coolio as Irwin
 Ray Romano as Ray Barone
 Robert Vaughn as James Sheffield
 Maria Conchita Alonso as Concepcion Sheffield
 Harry Van Gorkum as Nigel Sheffield
 Whoopi Goldberg as Edna
 Marla Maples as herself

Episodes

References

External links
 

1997 American television seasons
1998 American television seasons
The Nanny